Bobonaro is a town in Bobonaro Subdistrict, Bobonaro District, East Timor. The district capital is not in Bobonaro, but is in Maliana instead. Bobonaro suco has 1,532 inhabitants.

Notes and references

Populated places in East Timor
Bobonaro Municipality